Cards on the Table is a detective fiction novel by the English author Agatha Christie, first published in the UK by the Collins Crime Club on 2 November 1936 and in the US by Dodd, Mead and Company the following year. The UK edition retailed at seven shillings and sixpence (7/6) and the US edition at $2.00.

The book features the recurring characters of Hercule Poirot, Colonel Race, Superintendent Battle, with the crime writer Ariadne Oliver making her first appearance in a Poirot novel. The four detectives and four possible suspects play bridge after dinner with Mr Shaitana. At the end of the evening, Mr Shaitana is discovered murdered. Identifying the murderer, according to the author, depends wholly on discerning the psychology of the suspects.

The novel was well received, the critics noting its humour, the subtlety and tightness of the writing, and the good clueing. A later reviewer considered the book to stand at the very top rung of her novels, while another appreciated the brilliant surprise ending.

Plot
Mr Shaitana, a flamboyant collector, meets Hercule Poirot by chance at an art exhibition and brags about his personal crime-related collection. Scoffing at the idea of collecting mere artefacts, Shaitana explains that he collects only the best exhibits: criminals who have evaded justice. He invites Poirot to a dinner party to meet them.

Poirot's fellow guests include three other crime professionals: secret serviceman Colonel Race,  mystery writer Mrs Ariadne Oliver, and Superintendent Battle of Scotland Yard; along with four people Shaitana believes to be murderers: Dr Roberts, Mrs Lorrimer, Anne Meredith, and Major Despard. Shaitana taunts his suspects with comments that each understands as applying only to them.

The guests retire to play bridge, the professionals playing in one room while the others play in a second room where Shaitana relaxes by the fire. As the party breaks up, Shaitana is found to be dead  – stabbed in the chest with a stiletto from his own collection. None of the suspects can be ruled out, as all had moved around during the evening. Leading the police investigation, Superintendent Battle agrees to put his "cards on the table" and to allow the other professionals to make their own enquiries. Poirot concentrates on the psychology of the murderer.

The investigators look into the suspects' histories: the husband of one of Dr Roberts' patients died of anthrax shortly after accusing the doctor of improper conduct, and a botanist that Despard had been guiding through the Amazon was rumoured to have been shot. Anne's housemate Rhoda Dawes tells Mrs Oliver about an incident that Anne has been concealing, when an elderly woman for whom Anne was acting as companion died after mistaking poison for syrup of figs. Mrs Lorrimer's husband had died twenty years earlier, though little is known about that.

Mrs Lorrimer tells Poirot that she has just been diagnosed with a terminal illness and that she wishes to confess to killing both her husband and Shaitana. Poirot refuses to believe her psychologically capable of spontaneous murder, and thinks that she is protecting Anne. Mrs Lorrimer reluctantly discloses that she had actually seen Anne commit the crime, but feels sympathy for a young girl just starting out in life. The next day, each of the other suspects receives in the morning's post a confession and suicide note from Mrs Lorrimer. Battle informs Poirot by telephone that although several people had rushed to her house it was too late, and she had died of an overdose. Poirot is again suspicious, as he knows that Anne had visited the previous night. He discovers that, due to the established time of death, Mrs Lorrimer could not possibly have sent the letters.

Realising that Rhoda's life is in danger (she being the only person who might give Anne away), Poirot, Battle, and Despard race to Rhoda's cottage, arriving to find the two girls in a boat out on the river. Anne attempts to push Rhoda overboard, but Anne herself falls in and drowns, while Rhoda is rescued by Despard.

Poirot explains his findings. Although Despard had indeed shot and killed the botanist, that had been not murder but an accident. Anne poisoned her employer by switching two bottles to conceal her petty thieving. Although Mrs Lorrimer thought she had seen Anne kill Shaitana, Anne had in fact just leaned forward to touch him and confirm he was already dead.

Poirot explains that only one person was psychologically capable of carrying out a spur-of-the-moment stabbing, namely Dr Roberts. Believing that Shaitana meant to reveal him as the anthrax killer, Roberts quickly took his chance. He covered his tracks by forging Mrs Lorrimer's letters and killing her with an injection when he visited her house. Although Roberts initially protests, he is forced to confess when Poirot reveals a surprise eye-witness to the killing, a window-cleaner. After Roberts is led away, Rhoda notes what amazing luck it was that the window cleaner had been there at the exact moment of the fatal injection. Poirot replies that it had not been luck at all, and introduces them to a hired actor whose presence had prompted Roberts' confession.

With the murder solved, Despard courts Rhoda.

Principal characters
 Mr Shaitana – Wealthy man with a fascination for murders and murderers. In Hindi, शैतान ('Shaitana') can refer to Satan or the devil. The first victim of the case
 Hercule Poirot – Belgian private detective. A guest at Shaitana's dinner party
 Ariadne Oliver – Crime fiction writer, and Poirot's friend. A guest at Shaitana's dinner party
 Superintendent Battle – Detective from Scotland Yard. A guest at Shaitana's dinner party
 Colonel Race – Secret Service agent. A guest at Shaitana's dinner party
 Dr Geoffrey Roberts – Physician. A guest at Shaitana's dinner party who may have killed one of his own patients
 Mrs Lorrimer – Widow and expert bridge player. A guest at Shaitana's dinner party who may have killed her husband. The second victim of the case
 Major John Despard – Explorer and hunter. A guest at Shaitana's dinner party who may have shot and killed someone while on an expedition
 Anne Meredith – A young woman, formerly a personal companion. A guest at Shaitana's dinner party who may have killed one of her employers. She dies from drowning during the case
 Rhoda Dawes – Anne's wealthy friend and flatmate
 Mrs Luxmore – A widow whose husband died in suspicious circumstances

Foreword by the author
The novel contains a foreword by the author in which she explains that the novel has only four suspects and that since any of them, given the right circumstances, might have committed the crime, the deduction must be "entirely psychological". She notes that the book is no less interesting for that since "when all is said and done it is the mind of the murderer that is of supreme interest".

Literary significance and reception
The Times Literary Supplement (14 November 1936) stated favourably in its review by Caldwell Harpur that, "Poirot scores again, scores in two senses, for this appears to be the authoress's twentieth novel. One of the minor characters in it is an authoress of thirty-two detective novels; she describes in several amusing pages the difficulties of her craft. Certainly Mrs Christie ought to know them, but she continues to surmount them so well that another score of novels may be hoped for."

In The New York Times Book Review (28 February 1937), Isaac Anderson concluded, "The story is ingenious, but there are one or two loose ends left dangling when his explanation is finished. Cards on the Table is not quite up to Agatha Christie's best work."

In The Observer'''s issue of 15 November 1936, in a review section entitled Supreme de Poirot, "Torquemada" (Edward Powys Mathers) wrote, "I was not the only one who thought that Poirot or his creator had gone a little off the rails in Murder in Mesopotamia, which means that others beside myself will rejoice at Mrs Christie's brilliant come-back in Cards on the Table. This author, unlike many who have achieved fame and success for qualities quite other than literary ones, has studied to improve in every branch of writing in each of her detective stories. The result is that, in her latest book, we note qualities of humour, composition and subtlety which we would have thought beyond the reach of the writer of The Mysterious Affair at Styles. Of course, the gift of bamboozlement, with which Agatha Christie was born, remains, and has never been seen to better advantage than in this close, diverting and largely analytical problem. Cards on the Table is perhaps the most perfect of the little grey cells."The Scotsman (19 November 1936) wrote: "There was a time when M. Hercule Poirot  thought of going into retirement in order to devote himself to the cultivation of marrows. Fortunately, the threat was never carried out; and in Mrs Christie's latest novel the little Belgian detective is in very good form indeed. The plot is simple but brilliant." The review concluded by saying, "Mrs Oliver, the novelist, is one of Mrs Christie's most amusing creations."

E.R. Punshon of The Guardian reviewed the novel in the 20 November 1936 issue when he began, "Even in a tale of crime and mystery humour is often of high value." He went on to say that, "In this respect... Agatha Christie shows herself once again... a model of detective tales. There are delightful passages when Poirot anxiously compares other moustaches with his own and awards his own the palm, when his lips are forced to utter the unaccustomed words 'I was in error', when Mrs Oliver, famous authoress, discourses upon art and craft of fiction. But all that never obscures the main theme as Poirot gradually unravels the puzzle of which four bridge-players had murdered their host." He concluded, "Largely by a careful study of the score, Poirot is able to reach the truth, and Mrs Christie sees to it that he does so by way of springing upon the reader one shattering surprise after another."

Robert Barnard said, "On the very top rung. Special opportunities for bridge enthusiasts, but others can play. Superb tight construction and excellent clueing. Will be read as long as hard-faced ladies gather for cards."

Charles Osborne said, "Cards on the Table is one of Agatha Christie's finest and most original pieces of crime fiction: even though the murderer is, as the author has promised, one of the four bridge players, the ending is positively brilliant and a complete surprise."

Adaptations

Stage adaptation
The book was adapted as a stage play in 1981, although without Poirot. It opened at London's Vaudeville Theatre on 9 December 1981 with Gordon Jackson as Superintendent Battle and a cast that included Derek Waring, Belinda Carroll, Mary Tamm and Patricia Driscoll.

Television
 ITV adapted the story into a television programme in the series Agatha Christie's Poirot, starring David Suchet as Hercule Poirot and Zoë Wanamaker as Ariadne Oliver. The adaptation, written by Nick Dear, aired in the US on A&E Network in December 2005 and in the UK on ITV1 in March 2006. 

 The novel was also adapted as a 2014 episode of the French television series Les Petits Meurtres d'Agatha Christie.

Film
In 2016 a Bengali film Chorabali was released based on the storyline of the Cards on the Table. Barun Chanda played the role of Poirot.

RadioCards on the Table was adapted for radio by Michael Bakewell for BBC Radio 4, featuring John Moffatt as Hercule Poirot, Donald Sinden as Colonel Johnny Race, and Stephanie Cole as Ariadne Oliver.

Publication history
 1936, Collins Crime Club (London), 2 November 1936, Hardcover
 1937, Dodd Mead and Company (New York), 1937, Hardcover
 1949, Dell Books (New York), Paperback, (Dell number 293 [mapback])
 1951, Pan Books, Paperback, (Pan number 176)
 1957, Fontana Books (Imprint of HarperCollins), Paperback
 1968, Greenway edition of collected works (William Collins), Hardcover
 1968, Greenway edition of collected works (Dodd Mead), Hardcover
 1969, Ulverscroft Large-print Edition, Hardcover
 2007, Poirot Facsimile Edition (Facsimile of 1936 UK First Edition), HarperCollins, 5 March 2007, Hardback

The book was first serialised in the US in The Saturday Evening Post'' in six instalments from 2 May (Volume 208, Number 44) to 6 June 1936 (Volume 208, Number 49) with illustrations by Orison MacPherson.

References

External links
 Cards on the Table at the official Agatha Christie website
 Cards on the Table at Agatha Christie site. 2016
 

1936 British novels
Plays by Agatha Christie
Hercule Poirot novels
Novels first published in serial form
Works originally published in The Saturday Evening Post
Collins Crime Club books
British novels adapted into television shows
Superintendent Battle